Purple People Eater is a 1988 American science-fiction comedy film based on Sheb Wooley's 1958 novelty song of the same name, written and directed by Linda Shayne, and stars Neil Patrick Harris, Ned Beatty, Shelley Winters, Dustin Diamond, Peggy Lipton, and Thora Birch in her film debut. Chubby Checker and Little Richard made musical guest appearances. The film was released on December 16, 1988.

Plot
When young Billy Johnson (Neil Patrick Harris) plays the novelty song, a one-eyed, one-horned flying purple alien from outer space appears. The creature helps Billy prevent his elderly grandpa Sam (Ned Beatty) and Sam's neighbor Rita (Shelley Winters) from being evicted by their greedy landlord Ken Noodle (John Brumfield), all while playing in a rock and roll band.

Cast
 Neil Patrick Harris as William "Billy" Johnson
 Ned Beatty as Sam Johnson
 Shelley Winters as Rita
 Thora Birch as Molly Johnson
 Dustin Diamond as Big Z
 Peggy Lipton as Mrs. Johnson
 James Houghton as Mr. Johnson
 John Brumfield as Ken Noodle
 Molly Cheek as Mrs. Orfus
 Kimberly McCullough as Donna Orfus
 Lindsay Price as Kory Kamimoto
 Little Richard as Mayor
 Chubby Checker as himself
 Sheb Wooley as Harry Skinner
 Linda Shayne as Nurse

References

External links
 
 
 MSN Movies

1988 films
1980s science fiction comedy films
American children's comedy films
American science fiction comedy films
American independent films
Films based on songs
1980s children's comedy films
Films about landlords
1988 directorial debut films
1988 comedy films
1980s English-language films
1980s American films